Shaun White Snowboarding: World Stage is a snowboarding video game developed by Ubisoft Montreal and published by Ubisoft exclusively for the Wii.  It is the sequel to the 2008 multiplatform video game Shaun White Snowboarding.

Reception

The game received "average" reviews according to video game review aggregator Metacritic.

References

External links
 

2009 video games
Ubisoft games
White
White
Snowboarding video games
Sports video games set in Italy
Sports video games set in the United States
Video games based on real people
Video games developed in Canada
Video games set in Canada
Video games set in Chile
Video games set in France
Video games set in Japan
Video games set in Sweden
Wii games
Wii-only games
Wii Balance Board games
Wii MotionPlus games
Multiplayer and single-player video games